The Ranch is an American sitcom, created as original programming for Netflix by Don Reo and Jim Patterson. The show is centered around the Bennett family and their cattle ranch in Colorado. 

The show ran for four seasons, with each season consisting of 20 episodes broken into two 10 episodes parts. All episodes in each part were released as simultaneous batches, with the first part airing on April 1, 2016. All episodes are named after American country music songs.

Series overview

Episodes

Part 1 (2016)

Part 2 (2016)

Part 3 (2017)

Part 4 (2017)

Part 5 (2018)

Part 6 (2018)

Part 7 (2019)

Part 8 (2020)

References

Lists of American sitcom episodes